Wasa, also known as Wassa and Wasaw, is the common language of the Wasa people and a dialect of the Akan dialect continuum. It is spoken by 273,000 in southwestern Ghana, mainly in the Wasa Amenfi West and Wasa Amenfi East districts. There are also some Wasa speakers in Ivory Coast. Wasa is mutually intelligible with Fante, Akuapem, Asante, and Abron, the three which are collectively known as Twi. Its dialects include Amenfi and Fianse.

References 

Languages of Ghana
Kwa languages
Niger–Congo languages
Akan language